Andrew Jeffcoat (born 22 July 1999) is a New Zealand swimmer. He competed in the men's 50 metre backstroke event at the 2018 FINA World Swimming Championships (25 m), in Hangzhou, China. As of November 2022, he holds all three backstroke overall short course New Zealand records.

In April 2022 Jeffcoat was selected alongside six other debutants in a twelve-strong team to compete at the 2022 Commonwealth Games. He competed in all of the backstroke events, the 50, 100, and 200, and he won gold in the 50.

Personal best times
.

References

External links
 

1999 births
Living people
New Zealand male backstroke swimmers
Place of birth missing (living people)
20th-century New Zealand people
Swimmers at the 2022 Commonwealth Games
Commonwealth Games competitors for New Zealand
Commonwealth Games gold medallists for New Zealand
Commonwealth Games medallists in swimming
Medallists at the 2022 Commonwealth Games